Cell surface A33 antigen is a protein that in humans is encoded by the GPA33 gene.

The glycoprotein encoded by this gene is a cell surface antigen that is expressed in greater than 95% of human colon cancers. The open reading frame encodes a 319-amino acid polypeptide having a putative secretory signal sequence and 3 potential glycosylation sites. The predicted mature protein has a 213-amino acid extracellular region, a single transmembrane domain, and a 62-amino acid intracellular tail. The sequence of the extracellular region contains 2 domains characteristic of the CD2 subgroup of the immunoglobulin (Ig) superfamily.

References

Further reading

External links